{{DISPLAYTITLE:C23H30N2O2}}
The molecular formula C23H30N2O2 (molar mass: 366.49 g/mol) may refer to:

 Fumigaclavine C
 Ohmefentanyl
 Piminodine, an analgesic

Molecular formulas